The 2008 World Interuniversity Games were the tenth edition of the Games (organised by IFIUS, and were held in Budapest, Hungary, from October 6 to October 10, 2008.

Hosting
With Budapest as host city, 2008 marked the first time the Games took place outside Western Europe. The host of 2008 was the Budapest University of Technology and Economics (BME).

Competitions
Teams participated in seven competitions (four sports). For the first time the Basketball Women competition was held.

 Football Men
 Football Women
 Futsal Men
 Basketball Men
 Basketball Women
 Volleyball Men
 Volleyball Women

Football Men

Results of the Final Round:

Football Women

Results of the Final Round:

Futsal Men

Results of the Final Round:

Final standings

Football Men

Football Women

Futsal Men

Basketball Men

Basketball Women

Volleyball Men

Volleyball Women

External links
 IFIUS Budapest 2008

World Interuniversity Games
World Interuniversity Games
World Interuniversity Games
International sports competitions hosted by Hungary
Multi-sport events in Hungary
International sports competitions in Budapest
October 2008 sports events in Europe
2000s in Budapest